Black Ransom is a 2010 Hong Kong action thriller film directed by Wong Jing and Venus Keung and starring Simon Yam, Michael Miu and Fala Chen.

Plot
Before his wife was murdered, Inspector Mann Cheung (Simon Yam) was a model to young detectives. However, with his wife's death, he was indulged in deep sorrow and became downhearted and dispirited. Not only was his detective image affected, his relationship with his daughter Yan (Wada Hiromi) also went downhill. The new superintendent Koo Kwok-keung (Fala Chen) assigned him to take charge of a series of kidnapping cases. Several triad leaders were kidnapped, held to ransom and murdered. The modus operandi was violent, brutal, professional and efficient. Mann soon discovers that the gang of kidnappers were former members of the Special Duties Unit, led by Sam Ho (Michael Miu) and his girlfriend, Can (Qu Ying), a former member of the VIP Protection Unit, who were familiar with the police modus operandi and were able to escape from apprehension. Sam also discovers that Mann is after him. A duel to the death between the two elites of the police force is ensured.

Cast
Simon Yam as Inspector Mann Cheung
Michael Miu as Sam Ho
Fala Chen as Superintendent Koo Kwok-keung
Liu Yang as Eva
Qu Ying as Can
Kenny Wong as Ice King
Wada Hiromi as Yan
Vincent Wong as Spring
Xing Yu as Rocky
Andy On as Gundam Ko
Jiang Yang as Eagle
Samuel Pang as Bill
Adam Chan as Hui
Ricky Chan as Inspector Tiger Chan
Parkman Wong as Tang Qing
Zuki Lee as Tang Qing's wife
Richard Cheung as Uncle Dragon
Mark Cheung as Bull
Wong Ching as Wide Mouth
Winnie Leung as Mady
Ben Cheung as David Ho
Ada Wong as Ada
Gloria Wong as Bobo
Chan Pak-lei as Fifi
Frankie Ng as Triad boss
Lee Kim-wing as Triad boss
Chan Kam-pui as Triad boss
Siu Hung as Triad boss
Luk Man-wai as SDU member
Law Wai-kai as Thug
Tam Kon-chung as Tang Qing's thug
Lai Chi-wai as Ice's thug
Benny Lai as Ice's thug
Johnny Cheung as Thug

Box office
The film grossed US$339,557 (HK$1.89 million) at the Hong Kong box office.

See also
Wong Jing filmography

References

External links

Black Ransom at Hong Kong Cinemagic

Black Ransom film review at LoveHKFilm.com

2010 films
2010 action thriller films
2010 crime thriller films
Hong Kong action thriller films
Hong Kong crime thriller films
Hong Kong martial arts films
Police detective films
2010s Cantonese-language films
Films directed by Wong Jing
Films about kidnapping
Films set in Hong Kong
Films shot in Hong Kong
2010 martial arts films
Triad films
2010s Hong Kong films